Made in America is a nonfiction book by Bill Bryson describing the history of the English language in the United States and the evolution of American culture.

References 

Books by Bill Bryson
Linguistics books
Works about American English